Robert Vance Mitchell (October 22, 1943 – September 29, 2019) was an American professional baseball player. He attended Norristown High School in Norristown, Pennsylvania. He also played for the Nippon-Ham Fighters of Nippon Professional Baseball from 1976 through 1979.

Biography
He was traded along with Frank Tepedino from the Yankees to the Brewers for Danny Walton on June 7, 1971. He had 143 career MLB hits in 609 at bats, with 29 doubles, six triples and 14 stolen bases. He died in Sacramento, California on September 29, 2019.

References

External links

 Venezuelan Professional Baseball League

1943 births
African-American baseball players
American expatriate baseball players in Japan
Baseball players from Pennsylvania
Cardenales de Lara players
Evansville Triplets players
Florida Instructional League Red Sox players
Harlan Red Sox players
Leones del Caracas players
American expatriate baseball players in Venezuela
2019 deaths
Louisville Colonels (minor league) players
Major League Baseball outfielders
Milwaukee Brewers players
New York Yankees players
Nippon Ham Fighters players
People from Norristown, Pennsylvania
Pittsfield Red Sox players
Syracuse Chiefs players
Sportspeople from Montgomery County, Pennsylvania
20th-century African-American sportspeople
21st-century African-American people